Mrutyunjaya Nagaram is a panchayat in Parvathipuram mandal of Parvathipuram Manyam district in Andhra Pradesh, India.

References

Villages in Parvathipuram Manyam district